Ministry of Vengeance is a 1989 American action thriller film directed by Peter Maris and starring John Schneider, Ned Beatty, George Kennedy, Apollonia Kotero, Yaphet Kotto and James Tolkan.

Cast
John Schneider as David Miller
Ned Beatty as Rev. Bloor
James Tolkan as Col. Freeman
Yaphet Kotto as Mr. Whiteside
Apollonia Kotero as Zarah
George Kennedy as Rev. Hughes
Robert Miano as Ali Aboud
Maria Richwine as Fatima

References

External links
 
 

1980s English-language films
1980s Italian-language films
American action thriller films
1989 action thriller films
1989 multilingual films
American multilingual films
1980s American films